Kazuya Tsurumaki (鶴巻 和哉 Tsurumaki Kazuya) is a Japanese anime director. He was born on February 2, 1966, in the city of Gosen, located in the Niigata Prefecture.

He is the protégé of Hideaki Anno, and a longtime animator at Gainax. Tsurumaki's first project at Gainax was as an animation director for the 1990 TV series Fushigi no Umi no Nadia; Tsurumaki was also director of the humorous "omake" (extra) sequences that went along with the TV series, and producer of "Nadia Cinema Edition". In 1995, Tsurumaki served as an assistant director under Hideaki Anno in Gainax's landmark series Neon Genesis Evangelion, in which role he handled production, art director and setting assistant for some episodes. In 1997, he directed episode 25', the first half of the cinematic conclusion to the Evangelion series, The End of Evangelion.  In 2000, Tsurumaki officially made his debut as a full-fledged director with the six-part OVA series, FLCL. In 2004 he directed the hit sequel to Gunbuster called Aim for the Top 2! or Diebuster. He was a director for the new four feature Evangelion film series, Rebuild of Evangelion.  He directed the 2017 anime special The Dragon Dentist. He attended Otakon in 2001 and Anime Expo in 2016.

References

External links
 
 
A STORY OF COMMUNICATION: The Kazuya Tsurumaki Interview
Translation of Kazuya Tsurumaki Interview Part 1/2 – 16.10.2010
 Kazuya Tsurumaki anime works at Media Arts DB 

1966 births
Living people
Anime directors
Japanese animators
Japanese animated film directors
Gainax
People from Niigata Prefecture